Naku, Boss Ko! is a 2016 Philippine television drama political mini-series broadcast by GMA Network. Directed by Marlon N. Rivera, it stars Gabbi Garcia and Ruru Madrid. It premiered on April 25, 2016 on the network's Telebabad line up replacing Heart of Asia Presents. The series concluded on May 5, 2016 with a total of 8 episodes. It was replaced by Love Me, Heal Me in its timeslot.

The series is streaming online on YouTube.

Premise
Jon G, a young and inexperienced mayoral candidate was made to run by his politician father. The drama satirizes and parodies traditional Philippine politics and exposes the absurdity and hypocrisy of some of the campaign strategies used by most politicians today to win voters. It aired for two weeks right before the presidential election on May 9.

Cast and characters

Lead cast
 Tessie Tomas as Ms. F.
 Leo Martinez as Onofre Mesa Ganid / O.M.G.
 Ruru Madrid as Joven Jon Philip Ganid / Jon G.
 Gabbi Garcia as Cheverlyn "Che" Dimasupil

Supporting cast
 Arianne Bautista as Angela Mae "Gelai" Inocente
 Jackie Rice as Margeaux
 Archie Adamos as Achil
 Jao Mapa as Pepe
 Glenda Garcia as Martha Dimasupil
 Love Añover-Lianko as Cora Kamkam
 Vince de Jesus as M
 Patani Daño as Dora Mae
 Pekto as C
 Jay Arcilla as Emil
 Maey Bautista as Eya Binabalita
 Lance Serrano as Rob
 Dang Cruz as a reporter
 Gene Padilla as a reporter

Guest cast
 Divine Aucina as Osang
 Mel Martinez as Hanash
 Martin del Rosario as Carlos Manalastas
 Benjamin Alves as Kenji "Ken G." Ganid
 Jen Rosendahl as Madonna

Ratings
According to AGB Nielsen Philippines' Mega Manila television ratings, the pilot episode of Naku, Boss Ko! earned a 10.9% rating. While the final episode scored a 12.9% rating.

References

External links
 
 

2016 Philippine television series debuts
2016 Philippine television series endings
Filipino-language television shows
GMA Network drama series
GMA Integrated News and Public Affairs shows
Philippine political television series
Philippine television miniseries
Television shows set in Quezon City